Livingston United Football Club are a Scottish football club based in Livingston, West Lothian. The club joined the Scottish Junior Football Association in 1970, having existed as a Juvenile side since 1935. Their home ground is Station Park. They now play in the East of Scotland Football League

The SJFA restructured prior to the 2006–07 season, and United found themselves in the 15-team East Region, South Division. They finished 15th (bottom) in their first season in the division.

The team is managed by Stuart McInnes who was appointed the role after leaving his position as manager at Sauchie.

Club staff

Board of directors

Coaching staff

Source

Current squad
As of 31 October 2022

Notable former players
 Jamie Fairlie
 David Goodwillie 
 Peter Houston
 Dave Gibson
 Mark Yardley

Managerial history

c Caretaker manager

References

External links
 
 Scottish Football Historical Archive – Brian McColl

 
Football clubs in Scotland
Scottish Junior Football Association clubs
Association football clubs established in 1970
Football in West Lothian
1970 establishments in Scotland
Livingston, West Lothian
East of Scotland Football League teams